John-Marguerite-Émile Lemoinne (17 October 1815 – 14 December 1892)  was a French journalist.

Personal and public life

Early years
Lemoinne was born of French parents in London. He was educated first at an English school and then in France. In 1840 he began writing for the Journal des débats, on English and other foreign questions, and under the empire he held up to admiration the free institutions of England by contrast with imperial methods. After 1871 he supported Thiers, but his sympathies rather tended towards a liberalized monarchy, until the comte de Chambord's policy made such a development an impossibility, and he then ranged himself with the moderate republicans.

Career
In 1875 Lemoinne was elected to the Académie française, and in 1880 he was nominated a life senator. Distinguished though he was for a real knowledge of England among the French journalists who wrote on foreign affairs, his tone towards English policy greatly changed in later days, and though he never shared the extreme French bitterness against England as regards Egypt, he maintained a critical attitude which served to stimulate French Anglophobia. He was a frequent contributor to the Revue des deux mondes, and published several books, the best known of which is his Études critiques et biographiques (1862).

Personal life
Lemoinne died in Paris in 1892.

Works
 Les Élections en Angleterre, lettres publiées dans le "Journal des débats". Paris: J. Hetzel, 1841
 Les Anglais dans le Caboul. Paris: au bureau de la Revue des deux mondes, 1842
 Affaires de Rome. Paris: E. Blanchard, 1850
 Letters of John Lemoinne [on the Exhibition held in London in 1851]. In: Lardner, Dionysius The Great Exhibition, etc. 1852
 Études critiques et biographiques: Études critiques: Shakspeare, l'abbé Prévost, Goethe ...; Études biographiques: Brummel, O'Connel, Robert Peel, Haydon, Chateaubriand.... Paris, 1852
 De l'intégrité de l'empire ottoman. Paris: M. Lévy frères, 1853
 Le Passage du Nord. Strasbourg: Treuttel et Würtz, 1854
 Nouvelles études critiques et biographiques. Paris: Michel Lévy frères, 1863
 "La colonie anglaise". In: Paris Guide, 1868; Foreigners in Paris, Berlin: Readux Books, 2016
 Histoire de Manon Lescaut et du chevalier DesGrieux par l’abbé Prévost. Nouv. éd. précédée d’une étude par John Lemoinne. Paris: Levy, 1900

References
 Eugène Labiche; John Lemoinee: Discours de réception de M. E. Labiche. Réponse de M. John Lemoinne. Séance de l'Académie française du 25 novembre 1880. Paris, 1881.
 Ludwig Spach: Zur Geschichte der modernen französischen Literatur''. Essays von Ludwig Spach. Strassburg: K.J. Trübner, 1877.

1815 births
1892 deaths
Members of the Académie Française
French life senators
Chevaliers of the Légion d'honneur